Arnett, West Virginia may refer to:
Arnett, Braxton County, West Virginia, an unincorporated community in Braxton County
Arnett, Raleigh County, West Virginia, an unincorporated community in Raleigh County